Mauby (in Trinidad and Tobago, Saint Lucia, Jamaica, St. Vincent and The Grenadines, Grenada, Guyana, Bermuda, Barbados, Antigua and Barbuda and Anguilla), also known as maví (or mabí) in the Dominican Republic and Puerto Rico, mabi in Haiti and Martinique, and maubi in the Virgin Islands and Dutch Caribbean islands of St. Eustatius, St. Maarten and Saba), is a tree bark-based beverage grown, and widely consumed, in the Caribbean.  It is made with sugar and the bark and/or fruit of certain species in the genus Colubrina including Colubrina elliptica (also called behuco indio) and Colubrina arborescens, a small tree native to the northern Caribbean and south Florida. Recipes usually include other ingredients as well, spices such as aniseed being very common. Mauby was traditionally a fermented beverage made in small batches, but is now predominantly a commercial non-fermented soft drink.

Haiti and the Dominican Republic are two of the largest Caribbean exporters of the bark and leaves. Often the drink is fermented using a portion of the previous batch, while sometimes it is consumed unfermented. Mauby is often bought as a pre-made syrup and then mixed with water (sparkling or still) to the consumer's taste, but many make it themselves at home or purchase it from neighbourhood producers or street sellers. Its taste is initially sweet, somewhat like root beer, but changes to a prolonged, but not astringent bitter aftertaste. To many, it is an acquired taste, and has been known to cause an initial laxative reaction unexpected to many first-time drinkers.

Commercial soft drinks

Grupo Taino LLC of the Dominican Republic markets two commercial versions of mabi, both made with carbonated water. Seybano is lighter in color and made from tree bark extract and white and brown sugar, while Cacheo is darker and made from both bark and fruit extract, with spices and brown sugar. Contrary to its name, Mabi Cacheo does not include sap from the Cacheo palms (Pseudophoenix ekmanii and P. vinifera).

Mauby Fizzz is a commercially produced and carbonated version of the drink produced in Trinidad and Tobago by multinational PepsiCo from mauby bark. It is unfermented. A similar version is also produced in Saint Vincent and the Grenadines called Hairoun Mauby, produced by St. Vincent Brewery Limited, a company in the AmBev portfolio.

References

 
 
 

Fermented drinks
Soft drinks
Caribbean drinks
Barbadian cuisine
Trinidad and Tobago cuisine
Guyanese cuisine
Antigua and Barbuda cuisine